Flight of the Cosmic Hippo is the second album by Béla Fleck and the Flecktones, released in 1991. It reached number 1 on the Billboard Top Contemporary Jazz Albums chart. The album title came from an audience member who suggested "Flight of the Codeine Hippo";  the band changed "codeine" to "cosmic".

The album received two Grammy nominations.

Production
The group's version of "The Star-Spangled Banner" was recorded the night the Gulf War began.

Critical reception 
AllMusic's Brian Mansfield wrote: "The Flecktones owe more to bebop than bluegrass, and here the group finally names their style 'blu-bop.' That's why Flight of the Cosmic Hippo topped the jazz, not the country, chart. The Flecktones continue to make it look easy, adding banjo power chords to 'Turtle Rock' and reworking Lennon/McCartney's 'Michelle'." The Chicago Tribune wrote that "this is a group with a warm, engaging sense of humor and a desire to communicate, not a bunch of Berklee whiz kids practicing lessons in advanced harmonics." The Los Angeles Times wrote that "over the course of the Hippo album, the Flecktones ... essay a traditional Irish folk song, 'Star of the County Down'; a spirited rock 'n' roll number, 'Turtle Rock'; a jazzy take on the Beatles' 'Michelle', and a surprisingly soulful reading of '"The Star-Spangled Banner"'." The Indianapolis Star deemed the album "jazz, played with country instruments and down-home warmth—what Chick Corea might sound like if he played with the Nitty Gritty Dirt Band."

Track listing
All songs by Béla Fleck unless otherwise noted.
"Blu-Bop" (The Flecktones) – 4:22
"Flying Saucer Dudes" – 4:51
"Turtle Rock" – 4:12
"Flight of the Cosmic Hippo" – 4:29
"The Star-Spangled Banner" (Francis Scott Key, arr. The Flecktones) – 2:35
"Star of the County Down" (P.D., arr. The Flecktones) – 4:21
"Jekyll and Hyde (and Ted and Alice)" – 7:04
"Michelle" (John Lennon/Paul McCartney) – 5:10
"Hole in the Wall" – 4:40
"Flight of the Cosmic Hippo (Reprise)" – 2:14

Personnel
Béla Fleck – banjo (tracks 2, 4-10), electric banjo (tracks 1, 3), synth (track 1)
Howard Levy – diatonic harmonica (tracks 2, 3, 5-8, 10), piano (tracks 2-5, 7-10), synthesizers (tracks 1, 2, 4-6, 9), harp in a cup (track 4), harp through micro synth (track 2), double ocarina (track 9), Hammond B-3 organ (track 6)
"Future Man" – Synth-Axe Drumitar
Victor Wooten – 4-string, 5-string fretless (tracks 4, 5, 7, 8, 10) and 6-string electric basses

Production notes
Produced and mixed by Béla Fleck with the Flecktones
Bil VornDick	 – engineer, mixing
Carlos Grier	 – editing
Denny Purcell – mastering
Mark Nevers – assistant engineer
Keith Odle – mixing assistant
Richard Battaglia	 – assistant engineer, mixing assistant
Mark Tucker – photography
Elvis Wilson – design
Laura LiPuma – art direction
Mark Fox – artwork

Chart positions

References

Béla Fleck and the Flecktones albums
1991 albums
Warner Records albums